The 2006 WNBA season was the tenth season for the Houston Comets. The Comets qualified for the WNBA Playoffs for the 9th and last time in franchise history. It would also be the end of Van Chancellor's tenure as head coach of the Comets.

Offseason
Kiesha Brown was picked up by the Chicago Sky in the WNBA Expansion Draft.

WNBA Draft

 Ann Strother was later traded to the Phoenix Mercury.

NOTE: The Comets received Liz Shimek and Mistie Williams from the Mercury during the draft.

Regular season

Season standings

Season schedule

Player stats

References

Houston Comets seasons
Houston
Houston